Grzędy may refer to the following places in Poland:
Grzędy, Lower Silesian Voivodeship (south-west Poland)
Grzędy, Podlaskie Voivodeship (north-east Poland)
Grzędy, Masovian Voivodeship (east-central Poland)